David Lewis Outcalt (January 30, 1935 – November 2, 2013) was an American academic administrator, mathematician, and violinist. He was the chancellor of the University of Alaska Anchorage and the University of Wisconsin, Green Bay.

Early life and education
Outcalt was born on January 30, 1935, to Earl Kenyon Outcalt, a U.S. Navy officer, and Alberta Estes Ferguson Outcalt. He grew up in La Jolla, California. He attended Pomona College, graduating in 1956 with a degree in mathematics.

Career
Outcalt taught mathematics in Claremont and subsequently at the University of California, Santa Barbara.

In 1980, he moved to Anchorage to become vice chancellor of academic affairs at the University of Alaska Anchorage, and he became the university's chancellor the next year. During his tenure, he focused on expanding the university's academic exchange programs.

In September 1986, he became the second chancellor of the University of Wisconsin, Green Bay. He served until 1993 during a period of growth for the university, and oversaw the construction of the Weidner Center for the Performing Arts, among other facilities. After stepping down, he became part of the business administration faculty, a role he retained until 1998.

Personal life
Outcalt was a violinist.

Retirement and death
Outcalt retired to Kapaa, Hawaii in 1998. After his wife died in 2005, he moved to Pacific Palisades, California. He died there on November 2, 2013.

References

1935 births
2013 deaths
Pomona College alumni
People from La Jolla, San Diego
20th-century American mathematicians
American violinists
University of Alaska Anchorage faculty
University of Wisconsin–Green Bay people
Mathematicians from California
Claremont McKenna College alumni
Ohio State University alumni